Laurein is a comune (municipality) in South Tyrol in northern Italy, located about  west of Bolzano.

Geography

Laurein borders the following municipalities: Brez, Cagnò, Castelfondo, Cloz, Proveis, Revò, St. Pankraz and Ulten.

History

Coat-of-arms
The emblem represents a sable plough on or square, with the sides curved  and the corners decorated with shamrock on azure. The plough symbolizes the reclamation of the fields and their processing; the four vertices represent the four original German-speaking municipalities of Non Valley: Laurein, Proveis, Unsere Liebe Frau im Walde and St. Felix. The emblem was adopted in 1967.

Society

Linguistic distribution
According to the 2011 census, 96.71% of the population speak German and 3.29% Italian as first language.

Demographic evolution

References

External links
 Homepage of the municipality

Municipalities of South Tyrol
Nonsberg Group